Sheffield Phoenix Press Ltd. (SPP) is an independent academic publisher specializing  in biblical studies. It was launched in January 2004, continuing the traditions of the former Sheffield Academic Press.

SPP's main series of titles are Hebrew Bible Monographs, New Testament Monographs and Bible in the Modern World. It also has four commentary series, Critical Commentaries, Readings, Text of the Hebrew Bible and Trauma Bible. Its staff are its Directors, Professor David J. A. Clines and Dr Jeremy M.S. Clines, together with its Manager Louise A. Clines.

Since its inception, SPP has published about 340 titles, including monographs, collective volumes, Festschriften, and a handful of dissertations each year. Its authors reflect its worldwide reputation, coming from the United Kingdom, as well as Bulgaria, Denmark, Finland, France, Germany, Hungary, Ireland, Italy, Netherlands, Norway, Switzerland and Sweden, plus Australia, Argentina, Canada, Israel, Japan, Mexico, New Zealand, South Korea, South Africa, Taiwan and the USA.

All authors are promised that their work will be kept in print indefinitely.

Sheffield Phoenix Press exhibits its titles at the Annual and International Meetings of the Society of Biblical Literature, as well as at the meetings of the Society for Old Testament Study in the UK and more recently at SNTS and EABS. Customers are encouraged to order directly from the publisher, who prints its books through Lightning Source in the UK, the USA and Australia. The Society of Biblical Literature is its North American distributor.

Notable publications
Best-sellers include the following by year:

2020
 Claassens, Writing and Reading to Survive: Biblical and Contemporary Trauma Narratives in Conversation
 Kirova, Performing Masculinity in the Hebrew Bible
 Neyrey, An Encomium for Jesus: Luke, Rhetoric, and the Story of Jesus'
 Paynter and Spallione, The Bible on Violence: A Thick Description2019
 Avalos, The Reality of Religious Violence: From Biblical to Modern Times Clines, The Dictionary of Classical Hebrew Revised. II. Beth-Waw Nir, The First Christian Believer: In Search of John the Baptist Vaillancourt, The Multifaceted Saviour of Psalms 110 and 1182017
 Clines, The Dictionary of Classical Hebrew Revised. I. Aleph2016
 Tonstad, The Letter to the Romans: Paul among the Ecologists Wainwright, Habitat, Human, and Holy: An Eco-Rhetorical Reading of the Gospel of Matthew Clines, The Dictionary of Classical Hebrew. IX: English-Hebrew Index Scholz, Feminist Interpretation of the Hebrew Bible in Retrospect. III. Methods2015
 Avalos, The Bad Jesus: The Ethics of New Testament Ethics Adelman, The Female Ruse: Women’s Deception and Divine Sanction in the Hebrew Bible Porter, The Letter to the Romans: A Linguistic and Literary Commentary Charney, Persuading God: Rhetorical Studies of First-Person Psalms2014
 Carrier, On the Historicity of Jesus: Why We Might Have Reason for Doubt Korpel and de Moor, Adam, Eve, and the Devil: A New Beginning Overland, Learning Biblical Hebrew Interactively Spellman, Toward a Canon-Conscious Reading of the Bible: Exploring the History and Hermeneutics of the Canon2013
 Markl, The Decalogue and its Cultural Influence Lundbom, Biblical Rhetoric and Rhetorical Criticism Scholz, Feminist Interpretation of the Hebrew Bible in Retrospect. I. Biblical Books Zehnder and Hagelia, Encountering Violence in the Bible2012 
 Brodie, Beyond the Quest for the Historical Jesus: Memoir of a Discovery Beavis and Gilmour, Dictionary of the Bible and Western Culture Carey, The Gospel according to Luke: All Flesh Shall See God's Salvation Berges, The Book of Isaiah: Its Composition and Final Form2011 
 Leung Lai, Through the 'I'-Window: The Inner Life of Characters in the Hebrew Bible Heacock, Jonathan Loved David: Manly Love in the Bible and the Hermeneutics of Sex Avalos, Slavery, Abolitionism, and the Ethics of Biblical Scholarship Trevaskis, Holiness, Ethics and Ritual in Leviticus2010 
 O’Kane & Morgan, Biblical Art from Wales Putnam, A New Grammar of Biblical Hebrew Gray, The Book of Job Lundbom, Jeremiah Closer Up: The Prophet & the Book2009 
 Barker, On Earth as it is in Heaven: Temple Symbolism in the New Testament Wallace, Psalms (Readings) Goulder, Five Stones and a Sling: Memoirs of a Biblical Scholar Johnson, Now my Eye Sees You: Unveiling an Apocalyptic Job2008 
 Barker, The Gate of Heaven: The History & Symbolism of the Temple in Jerusalem Bodner, 1 Samuel: A Narrative Commentary Brett, Decolonizing God: The Bible in the Tides of Empire Fontaine, With Eyes of Flesh: The Bible, Gender and Human Rights2007 
 Exum & Nutu, Between the Text and the Canvas: The Bible and Art in Dialogue O’Kane, Painting the Text: The Artist as Biblical Interpreter Ogden, Qoheleth, Second Edition Rooke, A Question of Sex? Gender and Difference in the Hebrew Bible and Beyond2006 
 Moore, Empire & Apocalypse: Postcolonialism & the NT Schaberg, The Illegitimacy of Jesus: A Feminist Theological Interpretation of the Infancy Narratives, Expanded Twentieth Anniversary Edition Morrow, Protest against God: The Eclipse of a Biblical Tradition Holloway, Orientalism, Assyriology and the Bible2005 
 Barker, The Lost Prophet: The Book of Enoch and its Influence on Christianity Barker, The Older Testament: The Survival of Themes from the Ancient Royal Cult in Sectarian Judaism and Early Christianity Clines, The Bible and the Modern World Scaer, The Lukan Passion and the Praiseworthy Death''

References

External links
 
 American distributor website

Publishing companies established in 2004